Koffee with Karan is an Indian talk show on Disney+ Hotstar (previously broadcast on Star World India). Debuting on 19 November 2004, the show is hosted by film producer, director, and television personality Karan Johar and is produced by Dharmatic, the digital content division of his production company, Dharma Productions. The show is distributed by Disney Star and its first six seasons aired on Star World (2004–2019) with the second season being simulcasted on Star One (2007). In 2022, Koffee with Karan moved over to Disney+ Hotstar as a streaming exclusive under the Hotstar Specials label, with the seventh season airing on the streaming platform.

Series overview

Season 1 (2004–05)

Season 2 (2007)

Season 3 (2010–11)

Season 4 (2013–14)

Season 5 (2016–17)

Season 6 (2018–19)

Season 7 (2022)

Specials 
Occasionally, Karan Johar has filmed for some specials (each released with a different title) during gaps between the main seasons, for the promotion of then releasing films and series.

Footnotes

References

Lists of variety television series episodes
Lists of Indian television series episodes